Arsonists are people who commit arson.

Arsonists may also refer to:

Arsonists (hip hop group)
The Arsonists (play), 1953 play written by Max Frisch

See also
Arson (disambiguation)